The Ecuadorian ambassador next the Holy See is the official representative of the Government in Quito to the subject of international right the Holy See.

List of representatives

References 

 
Holy See
Ecuador